Moseley is a suburb of Birmingham, England.

Moseley may also refer to:

Places 
 Moseley (crater), an impact crater on the Moon
 Moseley, South Australia, a locality
 Moseley, Wolverhampton, a location in England in the West Midlands
 Moseley, Worcestershire, a location in England
 Moseley, California, a former settlement in the US 
 Moseley, Virginia, an unincorporated community in the US

Other uses 
 Moseley (surname)
 Birmingham Moseley Rugby Club, formerly known as Moseley Rugby Football Club, based in Birmingham, England

See also
 Moseley Square, Glenelg, South Australia
 Mosely (disambiguation)